Lauterbach is a town in the Vogelsbergkreis district of the federal state of Hesse in central Germany. In 1983, the town hosted the 23rd Hessentag state festival.

History
Lauterbach was founded between 400 and 800 AD. In 812 the town was mentioned for the first time in a document of the church in Schlitz. In the Middle Ages, Lauterbach belonged to the cloister in Fulda. Then in the 12th century Lauterbach became a fief of the count Ziegenhein from the cloister in Fulda. In 1266, Lauterbach received municipal rights. In the same year, Lauterbach started to build the castle (Burg) and the city wall.

Over the following centuries, ownership rights of Lauterbach changed often and were complicated.  Lauterbach became Lutheran following the Reformation.  With a pact in 1684, Lauterbach came under the control of the Riedesel zu Eisenbach (Riedesel). Up to 1806, the Riedesels had a small but independent territory. Following the Napoleonic Wars and Congress of Vienna, Lauterbach belonged to the grand duchy of Hesse. In 1852, Lauterbach became the seat of the new founded district (Kreis) of Lauterbach. In 1972, local governments were re-organized, and the new, larger district Vogelsberg was founded of which Lauterbach remains the seat of government.

Villages that belong to Lauterbach

In 1972, several villages were incorporated into the town of Lauterbach:
Allmenrod, Frischborn, Heblos, Maar, Reuters, Rimlos, Rudlos, Sickendorf, Wallenrod and Wernges.

Features
Ankerturm

The 'Ankerturm' is the only remaining tower of the city wall. It was used to be an observation tower. Temporarily it was also used as a prison.

Lauterbacher beer

Lauterbacher beer is the oldest beer in Hesse. The brand has existed since 1527.

Schrittsteine (Stepping stones)

The stepping stones were used as a shortcut to get to the local water fountain.

Hainigturm

The Hainigturm is a tower between Lauterbach and Angersbach. This tourist attraction was built in 1907.

Gallery

People born in Lauterbach
Friedrich Adolph Riedesel (born June 3, 1738, died January 6, 1800, in Braunschweig) – general who commanded a Brunswick regiment on behalf of the British during the American Revolutionary War
Fritz Selbmann (born September 29, 1899, died January 26, 1975, in Berlin) – writer, minister and official member of the party in the GDR
John Rock (born Johann Fels August 19, 1836, died August 9, 1904) – founder of the California Nursery Company in San Jose, California

People who lived in Lauterbach
 Peter Andreas Grünberg (born 18 May 1939 in Pilsen), won the nobel prize for physics in 2007. He spent his childhood and youth in Lauterbach. In 1959 he graduated from the Alexander-von-Humboldt-Gymnasium.

References

External links

Home page of Lauterbach
'Hohhaus' museum Lauterbach
Over 900 old and new pictures of Lauterbach

Vogelsbergkreis
Grand Duchy of Hesse